6E or 6-E can refer to:

6E, IATA code for IndiGo, an Indian airline
6th meridian east
A-6E, a model of Grumman A-6 Intruder
6e RG, abbreviation for 6th Engineers Regiment
South African Class 6E, a locomotive
Schleicher K 6E, a model of Schleicher Ka 6
Cat 6e, a type of Category 6 cable
6e, meaning 6th in French
6e-12e Régiment de Cuirassiers, or 6th-12th Cuirassier Regiment
6e Régiment de Parachutistes d'Infanterie de Marine, or 6th Marine Infantry Parachute Regiment
6e division légère blindée, or 6th Light Armoured Brigade (France)
Paris 6e (or 6e arrondissement), the 6th arrondissement of Paris
Paul, 6e duc de Noailles, or Paul, 6th duc de Noailles
Maurice, 6e Duc de Broglie, or Maurice, 6th duc de Broglie
Jean II, 6e Duc de Bourbon, or John II, Duke of Bourbon
Louis III, 6e Prince de, Duc de Bourbon Conde, or Louis, Prince of Condé (1668–1710)
6E, the production code for the 1983 Doctor Who serial Arc of Infinity

See also
E6 (disambiguation)